Laurence Johnston Peter (September 16, 1919 – January 12, 1990) was a Canadian educator and "hierarchiologist" who is best known to the general public for the formulation of the Peter principle.

Biography
Peter was born in Vancouver, British Columbia, the grandson of William Herbert Steves, the founder of Steveston, British Columbia. Peter began his career as a teacher in Vancouver in 1941. He received the degree of Doctor of Education from Washington State University in 1963.

In 1966, Peter moved to California, where he became an Associate Professor of Education, Director of the Evelyn Frieden Centre for Prescriptive Teaching, and Coordinator of Programs for Emotionally Disturbed Children at the University of Southern California.

He became widely known in 1969 upon the publication of ''The Peter Principle'--co-authored by Raymond Hull, also from Vancouver, ', in which he states: "In a hierarchy every employee tends to rise to his level of incompetence... [I]n time every post tends to be occupied by an employee who is incompetent to carry out its duties... Work is accomplished by those employees who have not yet reached their level of incompetence." The Peter principle became one of the most profound principles of management from the University of Southern California (USC). It is a heavily quoted principle at the USC Marshall School of Business. 

Another notable quotation of his is that the "noblest of all dogs is the hot-dog; it feeds the hand that bites it."

From 1985 to his death in 1990, Peter attended and was involved in management of the Kinetic Sculpture Race in Humboldt County, California. He proposed an award for the race titled "The Golden Dinosaur Award," which has been handed out every year since to the first sculptural machine to utterly break down immediately after the start.

Peter died of complications from a stroke at his home in Palos Verdes Estates, California, at the age of 70.

Bibliography

References

External links

 

1919 births
1990 deaths
University of Southern California faculty
Writers from Vancouver
Washington State University alumni
Canadian emigrants to the United States
20th-century American educators